Brigadier Lewis Ernest Stephen Barker,  (5 May 1895 – 13 December 1981) was a career Australian Army officer. He was born on 5 May 1895 in Mulgrave, Victoria, to parents Richard Barker and Edith Sibella Frances. He attended the Brighton Grammar School and the Royal Military College of Australia. After graduating, he became a lieutenant on 4 April 1916. He served in the 8th Field Artillery Brigade and later the 39th Battalion on the Western Front from 1916 to 1918, when he was transferred to the 12th Field Artillery Brigade and promoted to captain. For valiant actions, he received the Military Cross. In 1921, he married Alice Hope McEachern. He served in the army, and after various promotions took command of fortresses at Newcastle, New South Wales. In 1940, Barker took command of the 2/4th Field Regiment, and soon traveled to the Middle East, assuming command of the 2/1st Field Regiment. For his work, he was awarded the Distinguished Service Order.

Barker returned to Australia, and was made director of artillery. In 1942, he took command of I Corps' artillery. Barker soon assumed command of the artillery of the 7th Division, New Guinea Force and I Corps. He was then in charge of the artillery of the First Army, and was appointed a Commander of the Order of the British Empire. Barker next took command of the 4th Military District, retiring from the army 12 March 1949. Barker died on 13 December 1981.

References

1895 births
1981 deaths
Australian brigadiers
Australian military personnel of World War I
Australian Army personnel of World War II
Australian orchardists
Commanders of the Order of the British Empire
Companions of the Distinguished Service Order
Military personnel from Melbourne
People educated at Brighton Grammar School
Royal Military College, Duntroon graduates
People from Mulgrave, Victoria